Holocacista is a genus of moths of the family Heliozelidae. It was described by Walsingham and Durrant in 1909.

Species
 Holocacista capensis van Nieukerken & Geertsema, 2015
 Holocacista micrarcha (Meyrick, 1926)
 Holocacista pariodelta (Meyrick, 1929)
 Holocacista rivillei
 Holocacista salutans (Meyrick, 1921)
 Holocacista selastis (Meyrick, 1926)
 Holocacista varii (Mey, 2011)

Undescribed species

References

Heliozelidae
Adeloidea genera